Waitoriki is a locality in Taranaki, New Zealand. Inglewood is about 4.5 km to the southwest.

Demographics

Everett Park had a population of 2,175 at the 2018 New Zealand census, an increase of 123 people (6.0%) since the 2013 census, and an increase of 327 people (17.7%) since the 2006 census. There were 765 households, comprising 1,134 males and 1,041 females, giving a sex ratio of 1.09 males per female. The median age was 39.5 years (compared with 37.4 years nationally), with 489 people (22.5%) aged under 15 years, 342 (15.7%) aged 15 to 29, 1,119 (51.4%) aged 30 to 64, and 225 (10.3%) aged 65 or older.

Ethnicities were 94.1% European/Pākehā, 10.6% Māori, 0.6% Pacific peoples, 1.0% Asian, and 2.6% other ethnicities. People may identify with more than one ethnicity.

The percentage of people born overseas was 9.1, compared with 27.1% nationally.

Although some people chose not to answer the census's question about religious affiliation, 58.1% had no religion, 31.3% were Christian, 0.1% had Māori religious beliefs and 1.1% had other religions.

Of those at least 15 years old, 237 (14.1%) people had a bachelor's or higher degree, and 348 (20.6%) people had no formal qualifications. The median income was $37,100, compared with $31,800 nationally. 306 people (18.1%) earned over $70,000 compared to 17.2% nationally. The employment status of those at least 15 was that 966 (57.3%) people were employed full-time, 321 (19.0%) were part-time, and 39 (2.3%) were unemployed.

Education
Waitoriki School is a coeducational full primary (years 1–8) school with a roll of  students as of  The school began as the Wortley Road School in 1880.

Notes

Further reading

Schools

External links
 Waitoriki School website

Populated places in Taranaki
New Plymouth District